Banaganapalle Assembly constituency is a constituency of the Andhra Pradesh Legislative Assembly, India. It is one of 7 
constituencies in the Nandyal district.

Katasani Rami Reddy of YSR Congress Party is currently representing the constituency.

Overview
It is part of the Nandyal Lok Sabha constituency along with another six Vidhan Sabha segments, namely, Allagadda, Nandikotkur, Panyam, Nandyal, Srisailam and Dhone in Kurnool district.

Mandals

Members of the Legislative Assembly

Election results

2009

2014

2019

See also
 List of constituencies of Andhra Pradesh Legislative Assembly

References

Assembly constituencies of Andhra Pradesh
Politics of Andhra Pradesh